

In several Linux operating systems, the Software Updater (previously known as Update Manager) program updates installed software and their associated packages with important software updates for security or with recommended patches. It also informs users when updates are available, listing them in alphabetical order for users to choose which updates to install, if any. It was originally written for Ubuntu, although it is now part of other APT-based systems.

The application was originally called Update Manager; it was announced in May 2012 that starting with Ubuntu 12.10 the name would change to Software Updater to better describe its functions. Technically the rename is only done in the GUI, the name of the package containing the application, the executable and internally in the software it still uses the name update-manager.

The Software Updater cannot uninstall updates, although this can be accomplished by other package managers such as Ubuntu Software Center and more technically advanced ones such as Synaptic.

In Ubuntu, the Software Updater can update the operating system to new versions which are released every six months for standard releases or every two years for Long Term Support releases. This functionality is included by default in the desktop version but needs to be added to the server version.

Distributions that use the Software Updater
 Kubuntu
 Ubuntu
 Ubuntu GNOME
Ubuntu Kylin
 Ubuntu MATE
 Xubuntu
Zorin OS

See also

 Advanced Packaging Tool
 KPackage
 Package management system
 Synaptic (software)
 Ubuntu Software Center

References

External links

  
 

Linux package management-related software
Package management software that uses GTK
Software update managers
Ubuntu